Alia Jaques (born 20 May 1995) is a field hockey player from New Zealand, who plays as a midfielder.

Personal life
Alia Jaques was born and raised in Hamilton, New Zealand. The youngest of three children, Alia has an older brother, André, and older sister, Natasha.

Career

Domestic teams
In the New Zealand National Hockey League, Jaques plays for the Midlands women's hockey team.

National teams

Under-21
Throughout her junior career, Alia Jaques was a member of the New Zealand U-21 team on two occasions. She represented the team at the 2016 Junior Oceania Cup on the Gold Coast and at the 2016 FIH Junior World Cup in Santiago.

Black Sticks
Jaques made her debut for the Black Sticks in 2016 during a test series against Malaysia in Auckland.

During 2019, Jaques represented the New Zealand team during the inaugural tournament of the FIH Pro League.

References

External links
 
 

1995 births
Living people
Female field hockey midfielders
New Zealand female field hockey players
Field hockey players at the 2022 Commonwealth Games
20th-century New Zealand women
21st-century New Zealand women